Thomson Sandlands Allan (born 5 October 1946) is a Scottish former professional footballer who played as a goalkeeper.

Allan began his career at Hibernian in 1963, where he was a League Cup runner-up in 1968-69. He joined Dundee in 1971 and collected his only winner's medal at Hampden Park, when the Dark Blues defeated Celtic 1–0 in the 1973 Scottish League Cup Final.

Allan was called up to the Scotland squad that season, earning his only two caps in warm-up matches for the 1974 FIFA World Cup. He was selected in the squad for West Germany but was considered back-up to Leeds United's David Harvey and did not play during the tournament.

Allan reverted to part-time status when he started working at British Leyland's Bathgate plant and wound down his career with brief spells at Meadowbank Thistle, Heart of Midlothian, Falkirk and East Stirlingshire before retiring in 1983.

References

External links

NASL career stats

1946 births
Living people
1974 FIFA World Cup players
Dundee F.C. players
East Stirlingshire F.C. players
Expatriate soccer players in Canada
Falkirk F.C. players
Association football goalkeepers
Heart of Midlothian F.C. players
Hibernian F.C. players
Livingston F.C. players
Scotland international footballers
Scottish expatriate footballers
Scottish expatriate sportspeople in Canada
Scottish Football League players
Scottish footballers
Toronto City players
Footballers from West Lothian